Wolfius is a monotypic genus of seed bugs in the tribe Colpurini, erected by William Lucas Distant in 1902.  It contains the single species Wolfius exemplificatus, recorded from Thailand and Burma.

References

External links
 

Coreidae genera
Monotypic Hemiptera genera